Orthotylus tenellus is a subspecies of bug from a family of Miridae that can be found everywhere in Europe except for Albania, Croatia, Liechtenstein, Lithuania, Malta, North Macedonia, Portugal, and Romania.

References

Insects described in 1807
Hemiptera of Europe
tenellus tenellus